Peter Talbot may refer to:

Peter Talbot (bishop) (1620–1680), Roman Catholic Archbishop of Dublin, Ireland
Peter Talbot (politician) (1854–1919), former Canadian Senator